Icona drama is a species of comb-footed spider in the family Theridiidae. It is found in New Zealand.

References

Theridiidae
Spiders described in 1964
Spiders of New Zealand